Tereba is a surname. Notable people with the surname include:

 Stanislav Tereba (1938–2023), Czech photojournalist
 Tere Tereba, American fashion designer, writer, and actress
 Václav Tereba (1918–1990), Czech table tennis player